was a Japanese video game developer, founded in July 1987.

Due to the difficulties of recovering financially in the games market, in 2013, the Tokyo Court decided to start the company's bankruptcy process.

Games
Biometal (Super NES, 1993)
Blockids (PlayStation, 1996)
Castle of Dragon (NES, 1990) published by SETA Corporation (in Japanese) and Romstar (in English)
Crows: The Battle Action (Sega Saturn, 1997)
Daioh (Arcade, 1993)
De-Block (NES, 1989)
Dezaemon (NES, 1991)
Dezaemon 2 (Sega Saturn, 1997)
Dezaemon 3D (Nintendo 64, 1998)
 (Satellaview, 1996)
 (Apr-Aug 1996)
Sugoi STG-2: Crystal Guardian (May-Dec 1996)
 (Satellaview, Apr-Aug 1996)
Dezaemon DD (Nintendo 64DD, canceled)
Dezaemon Kids! (PlayStation, 1998)
 (PlayStation, 1996)
Dragon Unit (Arcade, 1989)
Family Quiz (NES, 1988)
Gambler Densetsu Tetsuya DIGEST (PlayStation 2)
J.J. Squawkers (Arcade, 1993)
Joshikousei no Houkago... Pukunpa (Sega Saturn, PlayStation, 1996)
Kaite tukutte Asoberu Dezaemon (Super NES, 1994)
Lutter (FDS, 1989)
Mahjong DX II (Nintendo GameCube)
Pocket Bowling (Game Boy Color, 1999)
 (Dreamcast)
Pro Mahjong Kiwame (Nintendo 64)
Pro Mahjong Kiwame (WonderSwan)
Pro-Mahjong Kiwame Final (working title) (PlayStation 3, TBA)
Pro Mahjong Kiwame Next (PlayStation 2)
Pro Mahjong Kiwame Tengensenhen (PlayStation, 1999)
Pro Mahjong Kiwame Tengensenhen (Goku Series) (PlayStation, 2000)
Strike Gunner S.T.G. (Arcade, 1991; Super NES, 1992)
Super Bowling (Super NES, 1992; Nintendo 64, 1999)
Sword Master (NES, 1990)
Taisen: Tsume Shogi (Game Boy Color - NP, 2000)
The Quiz Bangumi (PlayStation)
Virtual Bowling (Virtual Boy, 1995)
Waku Waku Volleyball (PlayStation)
Wit's (NES, 1990)
World Bowling (Game Boy, 1990)
Yakōchū (Super NES)
Yakōchū II: Satsujin Kōro (Nintendo 64, 1999)
Yakōchū GB (Game Boy Color)

References

External links
Company page
 

Video game companies of Japan
Video game development companies
Video game companies established in 1987